Dump is a vehicle for releasing the four-track home recordings of Yo La Tengo bassist James McNew. His recordings occasionally feature guest performers such as Sue Garner and Fontaine Toups (of Versus). For live performances McNew has been joined at various times by Ira Kaplan, Georgia Hubley, Todd Barry on drums, and David Ramirez on guitar.

Discography 
 Dump (7-inch EP) (18 Wheeler Records) 1992
 Superpowerless (CD album) (Brinkman Records) 1993
 Dump (7-inch EP) (18 Wheeler Records) 1994
 International Airport (10-inch mini-album) (Smells Like Records) 1995
 I Can Hear Music (CD/2-CD album) (Brinkman Records) 1995
 Phantom Perspective b/w The Lie (7-inch single) (Hi-Ball Records) 1997
 A Plea for Tenderness (CD album) (Brinkman Records) 1997
 That Skinny Motherfucker With the High Voice? (MC mini-album) (Shrimper) 1998 / (CD album; reissue with 5 extra tracks) (Shrimper) 2001(an album of Prince covers)
 Easter Dress b/w Almost Home (7-inch single) (Favorite Things) 1998
 Women in Rock (CD EP) (Shrimper) 1999
 Dive For Memory (7-inch single) (Third Gear Records) 1999 (split single with Lambchop)
 A Grown-Ass Man (CD album) (Shrimper) 2003
 Jennifer O'Connor & Dump (7-inch single) (Kiam Records) 2008 (split single)
 NYC Tonight (12-inch EP Single) (Presspop Music) 2012
 The Silent Treatment  (LP album) (Grapefruit Records) 2013
 Dennis' Picks Volume One (Cassette album) (Shrimper Records) 2016
 Blown Dunks (Cassette album) (Edita la Servidumbre) 2019
 Feelings 1 & 2 (7-inch single) (Care Records) 2020

External links 
Trouserpress entry for Yo La Tengo and Dump
Splendid ezine interview with James McNew
Dump Discography at Discogs

Musical groups from Virginia
Shrimper Records artists